Bruto Buozzi (26 May 1885 – 16 March 1937) was an Italian gymnast. He competed in the men's team event at the 1908 Summer Olympics.

References

1885 births
1937 deaths
Italian male artistic gymnasts
Olympic gymnasts of Italy
Gymnasts at the 1908 Summer Olympics
Sportspeople from Ferrara